Ferrand may refer to:

Clermont-Ferrand, a city
Clermont-Ferrand Cathedral
Clermont-Ferrand Auvergne Airport
Clermont-Ferrand Sports Hall

People 
 Adèle Ferrand (1817–1848), painter
 André Ferrand (born 1936), French politician
 Antoine-François-Claude Ferrand (1751–1825)
 Élisabeth Ferrand (1700-1752), French salon-holder and philosopher
 Francis Ferrand Foljambe (1748–1815)
 Jacqueline Ferrand (1918–2014), mathematician
 Jean Ferrand (born 1990), French sportsman 
 Jean-Michel Ferrand (born 1942), French politician 
 Richard Ferrand (born 1962), French politician
 Rufus Ferrand Pelletier (1824–?)
 Suzanne Ferrand (born 1902), French artist